Rustaveli may refer to:
 Shota Rustaveli (1172–1216), a Georgian poet
 Rustaveli Avenue in Tbilisi, Georgia named after the poet
 Rustaveli Theatre, a drama theatre in Tbilisi named after the poet
 Rustaveli (Tbilisi Metro), a Tbilisi Metro station named after the poet
 Rustaveli cinema, a movie theater in Tbilisi
 The title of the Georgian Orthodox bishop of Rustavi (and of Marneuli)